"Go Slow" is a song by English production duo Gorgon City, American DJ Kaskade and American singer Roméo. It was released on 9 May 2019 through Virgin EMI Records. It reached number one on the US Dance Club Songs chart in August 2019.

Critical reception
Las Vegas Weekly wrote that the track "demonstrates Gorgon City's crossover appeal—the duo can straddle the underground and the mainstream and find loyalists in both realms". Dancing Astronaut called the song a "bassline-driven house production that reverberates from speakers with an unmistakable sense of sonic power" and acclaimed Roméo's "buttery" vocals as providing a "point of contrast to the tinny grit of the song's defining bass elements". EDM.com described the track as having "melodic and dreamy vocal sections" as well as featuring "a funky and danceable bass line over a groovy house beat".

Charts

Weekly charts

Year-end charts

References

2019 singles
2019 songs
Gorgon City songs
Kaskade songs
Songs written by Kye Gibbon
Songs written by Kaskade